Terry Ryan (born May 13, 1938) is an American stock car racing driver. The Davenport, Iowa native competed in the NASCAR Winston Cup Series between 1976 to 1977.

Racing career
Ryan competed in the USAC Stock Car and ARCA Racing Series before his NASCAR career. He ran his first USAC race in 1971 with a locally purchased car. in 1975 he won the pole for the ARCA event at Daytona International Speedway.

After receiving new backing and a new car in 1975, Ryan went down to Daytona International Speedway to attempt to qualify for the 1976 Daytona 500. He posted the fifth-fastest time, but the times of A. J. Foyt, Darrell Waltrip and Dave Marcis were disallowed, leaving Ryan on the front row with fellow Iowan Ramo Stott. He finished sixth in that race, and attempted four more races that year; he failed to finish two and finished the other half in the top ten.

Ryan again made the Daytona 500 in 1977 but fell victim to mechanical issues in that race and the three after that. Turning a page in the second half of the season, Ryan finished three races, steadily improving to get a top ten in his final race of the year. He attempted Daytona in 1978 but failed to qualify and never again ran NASCAR.

After retiring from NASCAR in 1977, Terry eventually returned to the vintage racing circuits in 1997; where he was racing as of 2009.  Ryan was inducted into the Quad Cities Raceway Hall of Fame in 2008. His old Camaro from the NASCAR days could not be sold because of all of the rule modifications.

References

External links
 

Living people
1938 births
Sportspeople from Davenport, Iowa
Racing drivers from Iowa
NASCAR drivers
USAC Stock Car drivers